Jeff Stein may refer to:

Jeff Stein (author), SpyTalk columnist and National Security Editor for Congressional Quarterly's website, CQ Politics
 Jeffrey M. Stein, Republican nominee for the U.S. House of Representatives; see United States House of Representatives elections in Maryland, 2006#District 8
Jeff Stein, a character from the British soap opera Dream Team
Jeffery Stein, co-founder of Learning Technology Partners